Ska-ba-quay Tesson (ca. 1846 – 1929) also known as A Ski Ba Qua and Mrs. Joseph Tesson) was a Meskwaki artist who is known for her textile art.

Biography 
Tesson was born around 1846 and was part of the Meskwaki group of Native Americans. When items were purchased from her, she was living in Tama, Iowa. Tesson acted as a cultural informant for anthropologists studying her people.

Work 
Tesson's work, a yarn bag (c. 1900), in the collection of the National Museum of the American Indian in New York was attributed specifically to her, rather than to her tribal affiliation in 2010. Her textile work consisted of twined storage bags that had a tapestry-like appearance. Her work was based on traditional methods of weaving using nettle fiber and buffalo wool, but also incorporated new designs. Tesson also made bags using buckskin and porcupine quills.

References

Sources 
 

1840s births
1929 deaths
Year of birth uncertain
19th-century American women artists
20th-century women textile artists
20th-century textile artists
People from Tama, Iowa
Native American textile artists
19th-century women textile artists
19th-century textile artists
20th-century American women artists
Sac and Fox people
20th-century Native Americans
20th-century Native American women
19th-century Native American women
American textile artists